Mihir Diwakar (born 10 December 1982) is an Indian cricketer. He played 39 first-class and 36 List A matches between 1999 and 2009. He was also part of India's squad for the 2000 Under-19 Cricket World Cup.

References

External links
 

1982 births
Living people
Indian cricketers
Jharkhand cricketers
People from Siwan, Bihar